Triceromeryx is an extinct genus of Artiodactyla, of the family Palaeomerycidae, endemic to Europe from the middle Miocene epoch, 16.9—16.0 Ma, existing for approximately .

It was similar to Ampelomeryx, a herbivore.

Taxonomy
Triceromeryx was named by Villalta Commela et al. (1946). It was assigned to Giraffidae by Carroll (1988); and to Palaeomerycinae by Prothero and Liter (2007).

Fossil distribution 
 Cetina de Aragon, Zaragoza, Spain

References

External links 
 Triceromeryx at the Paleobiology Database

Palaeomerycidae
Miocene even-toed ungulates
Prehistoric animals of Europe
Prehistoric even-toed ungulate genera
Fossil taxa described in 1946